Honkai Impact 3rd is a free-to-play 3D action role-playing game (originally a mobile exclusive) developed and published by miHoYo, and later ported to Microsoft Windows. It is the spiritual successor to Houkai Gakuen 2, using many characters from the previous title in a separate story. The game is notable for incorporating a variety of genres, from hack and slash and social simulation, to elements of bullet hell, platforming, shoot 'em up and dungeon crawling across multiple single and multiplayer modes. It features gacha mechanics.

In addition to the game, the storyline of Honkai Impact 3rd spans multiple supplementary media including an anime series, multiple manhua series, and promotional videos.

Etymology
The word "Honkai" based on the Japanese 崩壊 (ほうかい, "collapse" or "decay"), pronounced "hōkai", which is the direct translation of the Chinese 崩坏 (bēng huài) used in the original Chinese title. (The "Impact" part of the title is absent from both the Chinese and Japanese versions, but may be a reference to the cataclysmic "impacts" that occur in the Japanese mecha anime series Neon Genesis Evangelion.) Additionally, in the game, Honkai Impacts, also referred to as Honkai Eruptions and Outbreaks, are large-scale Honkai disasters that coincide with the birth of a Herrscher. The game starts out in the post-3rd Impact era.

Gameplay
Honkai Impact 3rd has players control a team of up to three characters, known as "Valkyries", in real-time combat against various enemies. During battle, players may freely move their character around the battlefield and switch between their three deployed Valkyries in real-time. Each Valkyrie has unique attack, evasion, switch, and ultimate skills, as well as a type. The three types Mech, Biologic, and Psychic are based on a rock-paper-scissors-based system where types are advantaged and disadvantaged depending on both the enemy type and their own type. Additionally, the two types Quantum and Imaginary exist and are disadvantaged over each other, neutral towards the above three types, and advantaged over themselves. Valkyrie stats and skills can be changed with various weapons and equipment, which can be improved by using in-game resources. New equipment (known as "Stigmata"), weapons, and Valkyries can obtained either through in-game crafting or through a gacha system.

Single-player game modes include the "Story" campaign, consisting of stages punctuated by dialogue in cutscenes and full motion videos (FMVs), "Chronicles", a series of brief side stories that explore Valkyries' backstories or other aspects of the world, and "Open World", allowing exploration of several large open-ended fields to gather materials and complete various challenge tasks, coupled with their own storylines.

The game features various multiplayer cooperative and competitive modes such as "Co-op Raid", where players team up to progress through several stages and obtain legendary weapons and related rewards; "Memorial Arena", where players compete against a set of bosses for the highest score across the server; and "Abyss", where players attempt to progress as far as possible through a gauntlet of battles to compete for high scores against others in a small group. Players are able to join groups of other players, called "Armadas", which allow for more opportunities for events and rewards. Armadas allow for limited requesting of materials and resources from other players in the Armada.

Outside of battles, Honkai Impact 3rd allows players to interact with the Valkyrie and Stigmata characters through the "Dorm" mode. Upon completing character specific tasks, different characters may be able to move into the dorms, whereupon new character information and dialogues between those characters can be seen. Players can craft various pieces of furniture and design the layout of the dorm rooms to increase the "comfort" of the Valkyries and Stigmata therein. Greater comfort levels allow players to level up their dorm limits for more elaborate decoration. Players are able to visit and view each other's decorated dorm layouts.

Secondary gameplay mechanics include various minigames incorporating bullet hell, platforming, and shoot 'em up elements that allow players to gather various crafting and experience materials. Limited-time seasonal events may also include gameplay styles such as dungeon crawling and battle royale which are not normally seen in the main gameplay modes.

Weapons
Each Valkyrie can equip one type of weapon. The weapon types in the game are dual pistols, blade (katana), heavy (cannon), two-handed (greatsword), cross, fists (gauntlet), scythe, lance, bow, and chakram.

Players can obtain weapons through shop purchases, the gacha, crafting, and other ways.

After players obtain weapons, they can upgrade the weapons to improve their attribute effects.

After reaching player level 81 and weapon level 50, some weapons can be further upgraded into PRI-ARMs, changing their design, attributes, and effects.

Stigmata
Each Valkyrie can equip three Stigmata. Players can increase their characters' attack, defense, critical chance, and other attribute effects while those characters wear various Stigmata.

The Stigmata system can be divided into three types: top, middle, and bottom, which correspond to the types of attack, defense, and auxiliary. Players can also activate different set effects when wearing two or three Stigmata of the same set. Players can obtain Stigmata through the gacha, stage completion, events, and crafting. After players obtain a Stigmata, they can enhance, upgrade, and refine it to improve the Stigmata's stats and effects.

Item enhancement
Players can enhance Valkyrie stats by "enhancing" (leveling-up) weapons and Stigmata. Stigmata level up requires a different exp item type than weapons. Upon "enhancement", the equipment can get a better attribute effect bonus.

Item upgrading
Players can improve the attribute effect of equipment by upgrading weapons and Stigmata. All weapons or Stigmata can upgrade the star level through an "upgrade". After upgrading, the maximum level limit increases, allowing stronger effects. More advanced weapons and Stigmata require more advanced upgrade materials. Players can obtain upgrade materials by challenging stages, pulling in the gacha, and purchasing in stores.

Currency
The main currencies are crystals and coins, which have various non-premium obtaining methods. Asterite is a currency obtained from various miscellaneous sources throughout the game and can be exchanged for supplies in specific shops. Many of the game's gameplay modes and events each have their own corresponding currencies and shops.

Story

Setting
Honkai Impact 3rd is set in an alternate version of Earth, plagued by catastrophes resulting from "Honkai" (in Chinese translates as "Chaos", while in Japanese, it is said "Houkai".). Honkai is largely viewed as a malevolent force with a will of its own, able to corrupt humans into undead creatures, manifest itself in the form of various monsters, and select various individuals known as "Herrschers" to imbue them with god-like powers able to trigger apocalyptic events. The Honkai is a cyclic phenomenon, returning to end civilization on Earth each time it gets too advanced - the Previous Era ended 50,000 years prior to the game's start, after the 14th Herrscher defeated humanity.

In the present day, various global factions exist to combat or take advantage of the power of Honkai. These include "Schicksal", a European-based peacekeeping organization that deploys human warriors known as Valkyries to combat the Honkai; "Anti-Entropy", formerly the North American branch of Schicksal that objected to the use of human soldiers in favor of mechanized robots; and "World Serpent", a shadow organization manipulating events since the end of the Previous Era.

Prior to the story's start, three Herrscher awakenings (or "Impacts") have occurred in the Current Era: the Herrscher of Reason who became the leader of Anti-Entropy instead of fighting humanity, the Herrscher of the Void who was defeated by Schicksal and Anti-Entropy in 2000, and the Herrscher of Thunder who was prevented from fully awakening and sent to train her powers as a Valkyrie at Schicksal's St. Freya Academy.

Major Characters

Playable
Kiana Kaslana
Voice Actors:   (CN), Rie Kugimiya (JP)
The main protagonist of the game and recurring character in other miHoYo games. An homage to miHoYo's main character in their first game. The player will predominantly follow her perspective throughout the beginning of the story. Kiana becomes the second Herrscher of the Void, the Herrscher of Flamescion and the Herrscher of Finality.

Raiden Mei
Voice Actors: Ju Huahua  (CN), Miyuki Sawashiro (JP)
Kiana's girlfriend, and one of three major main characters and recurring in miHoYo series. Mei becomes the Herrscher of Thunder and the Herrscher of Origin.

Bronya Zaychik
Voice Actors: Hanser (CN), Kana Asumi (JP)
Seele's girlfriend, and one of three major main characters and recurring in the Honkai series. Bronya becomes the third Herrscher of Reason and the Herrscher of Truth.

Theresa Apocalypse
Voice Actors: Hua Ling  (CN), Yukari Tamura (JP)
The founder and principal of St. Freya Academy. Although she defies him, she is closely tied to Otto, who created her from Kallen's genes. She was close friends with Kiana's parents.

Murata Himeko
Voice Actors: Lin Su  (CN), Rie Tanaka (JP)
Teacher at St. Freya Academy and former Captain of the Hyperion. She was originally deployed to rescue Kiana, Mei and Bronya from Nagazora, and acted as their Squad Leader and Mentor after their enrollment. She is acquainted with Rita and Durandal through their common mentor Ragna Lothbrok.

Fu Hua
Voice Actors: Mace (CN), Minami Takayama (JP)
A member of the 13 Flamechasers of the Previous Era and ranked 12th, codenamed "Vicissitude". She was originally tasked with a mission to guide the current era, which caused the regions of her influence to deify her. Her backstory is recounted in multiple pieces of media including manga and the visual novel "Seven Swords". After acquainting Otto and striking a deal with him, she was employed as one of his agents.

Rita Rossweisse
Voice Actors: shourei xiao N  (CN), Aoi Yūki (JP)

Assistant of Bianka Ataegina and Maid of Schicksal. She is Durandal's second-in-command.

Bianka Ataegina/Durandal
Voice Actors: Miao☆Jiang  (CN), Mamiko Noto (JP)
Often called by her chosen name Durandal. The current strongest Valkyrie of Schicksal. Her backstory and origin are not revealed until the end of the first saga. She is the main character of the visual novel "Durandal".

Seele Vollerei
Voice Actors: Tang Yajing  (CN), Mai Nakahara (JP)

A girl from an orphanage who shares a body with the soul of the Previous Era’s 6th Herrscher. She is Bronya's beloved. One of the major supporting characters yet is a main character in one of her story arcs in the game. 

Kallen Kaslana
Voice Actors:   (CN), Nana Mizuki (JP)
An ancestor to Kiana and childhood friend of Otto. Called the most legendary Valkryie of Schicksal. She was executed after defying Schicksal and publicly declaring her love for Yae Sakura. Otto embarked on a quest to revive her.

Yae Sakura
Voice Actors: Du Mingya  (CN), Ayane Sakura (JP)
A shrine maiden from Yae village, she had a little sister named Rin. She met Kallen when Kallen fled from Schicksal forces to the Far East, and fell in love with her.

Elysia
Voice Actors: Yan Ning  (CN), Marina Inoue (JP)
A member of the 13 Flamechasers of the Previous Era and ranked 2nd, codenamed "Ego". She is the owner of the Elysian Realm and one of the major main characters of the "Elysian Realm" story arc in the game.

Mobius
Voice Actors: Cai Shujin  (CN), Rumi Okubo (JP)
A member of the 13 Flamechasers of the Previous Era and ranked 10th, codenamed "Infinity". She is a scientist responsible for the creation of stigmata and other projects.

SAKURA
Voice Actors: Du Mingya  (CN), Ayane Sakura (JP)
A member of the 13 Flamechasers of the Previous Era and ranked 8th, codenamed "Setsuna". 

Natasha Cioara
Voice Actors: Xie Ying  (CN), Sanae Kobayashi (JP)
A member of World Serpent, nicknamed "Raven". A highly skilled mercenary who runs an orphanage.

Carole Pepper
Voice Actors: Wang Xiaotong  (CN), Junko Iwao (JP)
A character from the futuristic open world "A Post Honkai Odyssey".

Pardofelis
Voice Actors: Jin Na  (CN), Nozomi Yamamoto (JP)
A member of the 13 Flamechasers of the Previous Era and ranked 13th, codenamed "Reverie". She acts as a merchant in the "Elysian Realm" gamemode along with her pet cat "Can".

Aponia
Voice Actors: Yang Menglu  (CN), Haruka Shiraishi (JP)
A member of the 13 Flamechasers of the Previous Era and ranked 3rd, codenamed "Discipline". She is a psychic with the power to see into the future and decipher people's fates.

Eden
Voice Actors: Zhang Anqi  (CN), Juri Kimura (JP)
A member of the 13 Flamechasers of the Previous Era and ranked 4th, codenamed "Gold". She was a superstar in the Previous Era and generous with her riches. She is often seen drinking alcohol. Elysia or "Ellie", as Eden so often lovingly calls her, is her beloved.

Griseo
Voice Actors: Zisu Jiuyue  (CN), Hina Kino (JP)
A member of the 13 Flamechasers of the Previous Era and ranked 11th, codenamed "Stars". The youngest of the Flamechasers, she is a painter with a beaming curiosity.

Vill-V
Voice Actors: Ruan Congqing  (CN), Hisako Kanemoto (JP)
A member of the 13 Flamechasers of the Previous Era and ranked 5th, codenamed "Helix". She is an inventor and magician with the ability to split her own mind. She created the Divine Keys from the core of the Previous Era's Herrschers.                   

Ai Hyperion Λ
Voice Actors: Wang Yaxin  (CN), Horie Yui (JP)
The Hyperion's administrator. She is often seen fixing bugs in Honkai Impact with her 3 miniature copies, referred to as the "AI"s.

NPCs
 Kevin Kaslana, A member of the 13 Flamechasers of The Previous Era and Ranked 1st, current head of the World Serpent and the first Kaslana. Also codenamed "Deliverance". His strength allowed him to eliminate a lot of previous era Herrschers. He acts as an antagonist throughout the majority of the story.
 Otto Apocalypse, head of Schicksal through the majority of its existence. He acts as the main antagonist in the first saga of the story.
 Sirin, got turned into the current era's Herrscher of the Void by Schicksal. She is a main character in the manga "Second Eruption". During the events of the game, she acts as the secondary antagonist, manipulating all the Honkai.
 Welt Yang, the second Herrscher of Reason and current head of Anti Entropy. He inherited his name from the first Herrscher of Reason.
 Frederica Nikola Tesla and Lieserl Albert Einstein, Anti Entropy scientists that frequently help the main cast.
 Su, A member of the 13 Flamechasers and Ranked 7th, codenamed "Bodhi" and MOTH scientist/doctor. A friend to Kevin. He is the antagonist of the manga volume "Second Key", during which he sends Durandal through tribulations in a bubble universe called Seed of Sumeru.
 Dr. MEI, a previous era scientist that lead humanity's effort against the Honkai.
 Cecilia Schariac, one of Schicksal's most powerful Valkyrie and mother to Kiana Kaslana. She plays a major role in the events of the Second Honkai War and is a main character in the manga "Second Eruption".
 Siegfried Kaslana, a Schicksal Knight and father of Kiana Kaslana. After the events of the Second Honkai War, he acted against Schicksal and the World Serpent. Latter captured him and keeps him at an unknown location.
 Kalpas, A member of the 13 Flamechasers of the Previous Era, Ranked 6th, and codenamed "Decimation".
 Kosma, A member of the 13 Flamechasers of the Previous Era, Ranked 9th, and codenamed "Daybreak".

Development
The production team for Honkai Impact 3rd grew from a 7-person start to employing over 200 employees in 2018. miHoYo offers small amounts of in-game currency to users that fill out surveys about their experience in the game, allowing the game's developers to adjust future events and tweak the game. As a result, Honkai Impact 3rd is under a continuous-update system, patching bug fixes and changing or adding content multiple times per year. The game has had many significant changes since launch, including rewriting the entire first two chapters of the story in a December 2018 update. The developers stated that their decision to make Honkai Impact 3rd be in the free-to-play monetization system (rather than a premium, or paid, game) with the purpose of making the game more available to players. Devil May Cry and Bayonetta significantly affected the game makers' ideas for the fight system of Honkai Impact 3rd.

After a few years of users emulating Honkai Impact 3rd on computers and an update making emulation more difficult, the game's official PC version was developed, releasing to the public on December 26, 2019.

Manga
Honkai Impact 3rd features an ongoing serialized manga of the same name in Chinese and in English. The manga begins before Chapter 1 of the main game story arc that aims to supplement and flesh out the in-game plot, and often includes character origins. Several in-game battlesuits worn by the Valkyries are illustrated in the manga as well. The manga has three prequel titles and one main title.

Media

Anime
A non-canon slice of life cooking television anime series featuring 19 short episodes Cooking with Valkyries was released from July to September 2020. The Bilibili releases are available in Mandarin Chinese, while the Japanese broadcast versions are in Japanese.

Another non-canon anime called "ELF Academy" with 10 episodes was released from July  to September 2021. There is a finished version in Mandarin and a Japanese version that is still airing. This series is about ELFs (Equipment: Living Form), which are autonomous weapons created to replace living soldiers, going to school and interacting with each other.

Reception

The game first attracted a large fanbase in Asia before spreading globally: first released in China in late 2016, it reached 1 million downloads in Japan 11 days after release, and IGN reported that Honkai Impact 3rd gathered a total of 35 million downloads worldwide as of March 28, 2018. The game has been released in Korea, Taiwan, Southeast Asia, North America, and Europe, and supports multiple languages including Simplified Chinese, Traditional Chinese, English, Japanese, Korean, Vietnamese, Thai, French, German, and Indonesian.

In an article from 2017, Ungeek.com says that the game has some later-game systems that are unintuitive, and cites the large download size for a mobile game as a negative. The review praised the game's visual quality and the ease of learning to play the game, as well as the overall quality of the game, and positively recommended it. The article mentioned that the quality of the game was comparable to console games.

Controversies

On April 22, 2021, as part of the 3rd anniversary of the game's global server, a music video titled "Brilliant Bright" in collaboration with Myth & Roid, was released on miHoYo's Honkai Impact 3rd YouTube channel. While the video featured characters wearing bunny-girl outfits, none of the outfits were actually made available in-game - the cosmetics were solely for the purpose of the video. The backlash from the Chinese players was immediate and severe, with many considering it insensitive and unfair to release content for international players only. Two days later, on April 24, one Chinese man, armed with a knife, was reported to have infiltrated the developers' office of miHoYo in Shanghai, in an allegedly planned, but failed attempt to assassinate the miHoYo founders, before he was apprehended on the spot and sent in police custody.

Since the incident, the special video from Honkai Impact 3rd was removed from their channel, although the video itself is still available online, through fan reuploads. The Japanese band Myth & Roid have pulled out from the collaboration, and also had their special video single removed, but Brilliant Bright will still be available through streaming platforms and will be released as their digital single. In the game, any content related to 3rd-anniversary bunny girls, with the exception of the correlating event stigmata, are now removed as according to the game's official statement and was instead given 500 crystals for every GLB player as compensation. Chinese server players were given greater compensation (10 focused supply cards = 2800 crystal), despite not actually having any content removed in the Chinese version.

See also 
 Action Taimanin, a game with similar gameplay
 Genshin Impact, another game also developed by miHoYo with similar characters
 Honkai: Star Rail, an upcoming game that will be the 4th in its series
 Punishing: Gray Raven, a mobile game with similar gameplay and futuristic setting

References

External links
 

2016 video games
Action role-playing video games
Android (operating system) games
Apocalyptic video games
Gacha games
Hack and slash games
IOS games
Mobile games
Science fiction video games
Video games adapted into comics
Video games adapted into television shows
Video games containing battle passes
Video games developed in China
Video games featuring female protagonists
Free-to-play video games
Windows games
MiHoYo games
Comedy anime and manga
Cooking in anime and manga
Slice of life anime and manga
Cloning in fiction